Sigismund Francis, Archduke of Further Austria (27 November 1630 – 25 June 1665) was the ruler of Further Austria including Tyrol from 1662 to 1665.

Biography
He was born at Innsbruck, the second son of Leopold V, Archduke of Austria and Claudia de' Medici. He  was appointed as bishop of Augsburg in 1646. In 1653, he became bishop of Gurk and in 1659 bishop of Trent. He was never ordained as a priest or consecrated as a bishop.

In 1662 he was put forth by his cousin Leopold I, Holy Roman Emperor as a candidate for Archbishop of Strasbourg.  This included large cash incentives to the cathedral chapter and a promise that Sigismund would be a very hands off ruler.  
After the 1662 death of his brother Archduke Ferdinand Charles, he became Archduke of Further Austria, and therefore withdrew from the candidacy for the bishopric.  He was more able than his brother and could have made him a good ruler, but with his early death in 1665 the younger Tyrolean line of the Habsburg house ended. Leopold I, who as the heir male succeeded Sigismund Francis, took direct control over the government of Further Austria and Tyrol.

He married Hedwig of the Palatinate-Sulzbach on 3 June 1665 and died in Innsbruck twenty-two days later of an illness.

Ancestors

References

Works cited

1630 births
1665 deaths
17th-century archdukes of Austria
Counts of Tyrol
Sigismund Francis of Austria, Archduke
People from Innsbruck
Bishops of Gurk